Rosenborg is a neighbourhood in the city of Trondheim in Trøndelag county, Norway.  It is located in the borough of Østbyen.  It is located east of Møllenberg, south of Lademoen, north of Tyholt, and west of Persaunet.  The eastern part of Rosenborg also borders to Kristiansten Fortress and the surrounding park. The area is mostly residential, both houses and apartments. There is also a large amateur football arena that among others hosts the women's team Trondheims-Ørn. The area also has given name to the Norwegian Premier League team Rosenborg Ballklub, that now is located at Lerkendal.

See also
Rosenvinge (noble family)

References

Geography of Trondheim
Neighbourhoods of Trondheim